Constitution of 1982 may refer to:

Constitution Act, 1982, Canada
1982 Constitution of the People's Republic of China
Turkish Constitution of 1982